The Holy See has long been recognised as a subject of international law and as an active participant in international relations. One observer has stated that its interaction with the world has, in the period since World War II, been at its highest level ever. It is distinct from the city-state of the Vatican City, over which the Holy See has "full ownership, exclusive dominion, and sovereign authority and jurisdiction".

The diplomatic activities of the Holy See are directed by the Secretariat of State (headed by the Cardinal Secretary of State), through the Section for Relations with States.

The Holy See recognizes all UN member states, except for the People's Republic of China (as the Holy See only recognizes the Republic of China) and North Korea (as the Holy See only has relations with South Korea). The Holy See also recognizes the State of Palestine, the only other non-UN member it recognizes besides Taiwan (ROC).

The term "Vatican Diplomatic Corps", by contrast with the diplomatic service of the Holy See, properly refers to all those diplomats accredited to the Holy See, not those who represent its interests to other nations and international bodies. Since 1961, Vatican diplomats also enjoy diplomatic immunity.

History

Since medieval times the episcopal see of Rome has been recognized as a sovereign entity. Earlier, there were papal representatives (apocrisiarii) to the Emperors of Constantinople, beginning in 453, but they were not thought of as ambassadors. In the eleventh century the sending of papal representatives to princes, on a temporary or permanent mission, became frequent. In the fifteenth century it became customary for states to accredit permanent resident ambassadors to the Pope in Rome. The first permanent papal nunciature was established in 1500 in Venice. Their number grew in the course of the sixteenth century to thirteen, while internuncios (representatives of second rank) were sent to less-powerful states. After enjoying a brilliant period in the first half of the seventeenth century, papal diplomacy declined after the Peace of Westphalia in 1648, being assailed especially by royalists and Gallicans, and the number of functioning nuncios was reduced to two in the time of Napoleon, although in the same period, in 1805, Prussia became the first Protestant state to send an ambassador to Rome. There was a revival after the Congress of Vienna in 1815, which, while laying down that, in general, the order of precedence between ambassadors would be determined by the date of their arrival, allowed special precedence to be given to the nuncio, by which he would always be the dean of the diplomatic corps.

In spite of the extinction of the Papal States in 1870, and the consequent loss of territorial sovereignty, and in spite of some uncertainty among jurists as to whether it could continue to act as an independent personality in international matters, the Holy See continued in fact to exercise the right to send and receive diplomatic representatives, maintaining relations with states that included the major powers of Russia, Prussia, and Austria-Hungary. Countries continued to receive nuncios as diplomatic representatives of full rank, and where, in accordance with the decision of the 1815 Congress of Vienna, the Nuncio was not only a member of the Diplomatic Corps but its dean, this arrangement continued to be accepted by the other ambassadors.

With the First World War and its aftermath the number of states with diplomatic relations with the Holy See increased. For the first time since relations were broken between the Pope and Queen Elizabeth I of England, a British diplomatic mission to the Holy See was opened in 1914. The result was that, instead of diminishing, the number of diplomats accredited to the Holy See grew from sixteen in 1870 to twenty-seven in 1929, even before it again acquired territorial sovereignty with the founding of the State of Vatican City.

In the same period, the Holy See concluded a total of twenty-nine concordats and other agreements with states, including Austro-Hungary in 1881, Russia in 1882 and 1907, France in 1886 and 1923. Two of these concordats were registered at the League of Nations at the request of the countries involved.

While bereft of territorial sovereignty, the Holy See also accepted requests to act as arbitrator between countries, including a dispute between Germany and Spain over the Caroline Islands.

The Lateran Treaty of 1929 and the founding of the Vatican City State was not followed by any great immediate increase in the number of states with which the Holy See had official relations. This came later, especially after the Second World War.

The Vienna Convention of April 18, 1961 also established diplomatic immunity for the Vatican's foreign diplomats. Such immunity can only be revoked by the Holy See.

Diplomatic relations

Bilateral relations
The Holy See, as a non-state sovereign entity and full subject of international law, started establishing diplomatic relations with sovereign states in the 15th century. It had the territory of the States of the Church under its direct sovereign rule since centuries before that time. Currently it has the territory of the State of the Vatican City under its direct sovereign rule. In the period of 1870–1929 between the annexation of Rome by the Kingdom of Italy and the ratification of the Lateran Treaty establishing the current Vatican City State, the Holy See was devoid of territory. In this period some states suspended their diplomatic relations, but others retained them (or established such relations for the first time or reestablished them after a break), so that the number of states that did have diplomatic relations with the Holy See almost doubled (from 16 to 27) in the period between 1870 and 1929.

The Holy See currently has diplomatic relations with 183 sovereign states (including the partially internationally recognized Republic of China) and, in addition, with the sovereign entity Order of Malta and the supranational union European Union. The Holy See also has established official diplomatic relations with the State of Palestine.

By agreement with the government of Vietnam, it has a non-resident papal representative to that country. It has official formal contacts, without establishing diplomatic relations, with: Afghanistan, Brunei, Somalia and Saudi Arabia.

The Holy See additionally maintains some apostolic delegates to local Catholic Church communities which are not accredited to the governments of the respective states and work only in an unofficial, non-diplomatic capacity. The regions and states where such non-diplomatic delegates operate are: Brunei, Comoros, Laos, Somalia, Vietnam, Jerusalem and the Palestinian territories (Palestine), Pacific Ocean (Tuvalu, dependent territories), Arabian Peninsula (foreigners in Saudi Arabia), Antilles (dependent territories), apostolic delegate to Kosovo (Republic of Kosovo) and the apostolic prefecture of Western Sahara (Sahrawi Arab Democratic Republic).

The Holy See has no relations of any kind with the following states:
 Kingdom of Bhutan (see Catholic Church in Bhutan)
 Republic of the Maldives (see Catholic Church in the Maldives)
 People's Republic of China (see Catholic Church in China)
 Democratic People's Republic of Korea (see Catholic Church in North Korea)

89 embassies to the Holy See are based in Rome.

The Holy See is the only European subject of international law to have diplomatic relations with the Republic of China (Taiwan), although there have been reports of informal talks between the Holy See and the government of the People's Republic of China on establishing diplomatic relations, restoring the situation that existed when the papal representative, Antonio Riberi, was part of the diplomatic corps that accepted the Communist government military victory instead of withdrawing with the Nationalist authorities to Taiwan. He was later expelled, after which the Holy See sent its representative to Taipei instead.

During the pontificate of Pope Benedict XVI relations were established with Montenegro (2006), the United Arab Emirates (2007), Botswana (2008), Russia (2009), Malaysia (2011), and South Sudan (2013), and during the pontificate of Pope Francis, diplomatic relations were established with the State of Palestine (2015), Mauritania (2016), Myanmar (2017), and Oman (2023). "Relations of a special nature" had previously been in place with Russia.

Africa

Americas

Asia

Europe

Oceania

Multilateral politics

Participation in international organizations
The Holy See is active in international organizations and is a member of the following groups:

 International Committee of Military Medicine (ICMM)
 International Atomic Energy Agency (IAEA)
 International Organization for Migration (IOM)
 International Organization of Supreme Audit Institutions (INTOSAI)
 Organisation for the Prohibition of Chemical Weapons (OPCW)
 Organization for Security and Co-operation in Europe (OSCE)
 Preparatory Commission for the Comprehensive Test Ban Treaty Organization (CTBTO)
 International Institute for the Unification of Private Law (UNIDROIT)
 United Nations High Commissioner for Refugees (UNHCR)
 United Nations Conference on Trade and Development (UNCTAD)
 World Intellectual Property Organization (WIPO)

The Holy See has the status of permanent observer state in:

United Nations (UN)
World Health Organization (WHO)

The Holy See is also a permanent observer of the following international organizations:

 Council of Europe in Strasbourg
 International Labour Organization (ILO)
 International Fund for Agricultural Development (IFAD)
 International Commission on Civil Status (CIEC)
 Latin Union (LU)
 Organization of American States (OAS)
 Organisation of African Unity (OAU)
 United Nations
 UNESCO (United Nations Educational, Scientific and Cultural Organization)
 United Nations Industrial Development Organization (UNIDO)
 United Nations Development Programme (UNDP)
 United Nations Environment Programme (UNEP)
 United Nations International Drug Control Programme (UNDCP)
 United Nations Centre for Human Settlements (UNCHS)
 Food and Agriculture Organization (FAO)
 World Tourism Organization (WToO)
 World Trade Organization (WTO)
 World Food Programme (WFP)

The Holy See is an observer on an informal basis of the following groups:

 Asian-African Legal Consultative Organization (AALCO)
 International Decade for Natural Disaster Reduction (ISDR, 1990s)
 International Maritime Organization (IMO)
 International Civil Aviation Organization (ICAO)
 United Nations Committee on the Peaceful Uses of Outer Space (UNCOPUOS)
 World Meteorological Organization in Geneva (WMO)

The Holy See sends a delegate to the Arab League in Cairo. It is also a guest of honour to the Parliamentary Assembly of the Organization for Security and Cooperation in Europe.

Activities of the Holy See within the United Nations system

Since 6 April 1964, the Holy See has been a permanent observer state at the United Nations. In that capacity, the Holy See has since had a standing invitation to attend all the sessions of the United Nations General Assembly, the United Nations Security Council, and the United Nations Economic and Social Council to observe their work, and to maintain a permanent observer mission at the UN headquarters in New York. Accordingly, the Holy See has established a Permanent Observer Mission in New York, has sent representatives to all open meetings of the General Assembly and of its Main Committees, and has been able to influence their decisions and recommendations.

Relationship with Vatican City
Although the Holy See is closely associated with Vatican City, the independent territory over which the Holy See is sovereign, the two entities are separate and distinct.

The State of the Vatican City was created by the Lateran Treaty in 1929 to "ensure the absolute and visible independence of the Holy See" and "to guarantee to it an indisputable sovereignty in international affairs" (quotations from the treaty). Archbishop Jean-Louis Tauran, the Holy See's former Secretary for Relations with States, said that the Vatican City is a "minuscule support-state that guarantees the spiritual freedom of the Pope with the minimum territory."

The Holy See, not Vatican City, maintains diplomatic relations with states, and foreign embassies are accredited to the Holy See, not to Vatican City State. It is the Holy See that establishes treaties and concordats with other sovereign entities and likewise, generally, it is the Holy See that participates in international organizations, with the exception of those dealing with technical matters of clearly territorial character, such as:

 European Conference of Postal and Telecommunications Administrations (CEPT)
 European Telecommunication Satellite Organization (EUTELSAT)
 International Grains Council (IGC)
 International Institute of Administrative Sciences (IISA)
 International Telecommunications Satellite Organization (ITSO)
 International Telecommunication Union (ITU)
 Interpol
 Universal Postal Union (UPU)

Under the terms of the Lateran Treaty, the Holy See has extraterritorial authority over various sites in Rome and two Italian sites outside of Rome, including the Pontifical Palace at Castel Gandolfo. The same authority is extended under international law over the Apostolic Nunciature of the Holy See in a foreign country.

Diplomatic representations to the Holy See
Of the diplomatic missions accredited to the Holy See, 89 are situated in Rome, although those countries, if they also have an embassy to Italy, then have two embassies in the same city, since, by agreement between the Holy See and Italy, the same person cannot at the same time be accredited to both. The United Kingdom recently housed its embassy to the Holy See in the same building as its embassy to the Italian Republic, a move that led to a diplomatic protest from the Holy See. An ambassador accredited to a country other than Italy can be accredited also to the Holy See. For example, the embassy of India, located in Bern, to Switzerland and Liechtenstein is also accredited to the Holy See while the Holy See maintains an Apostolic Nunciature in New Delhi. For reasons of economy, smaller countries accredit to the Holy See a mission situated elsewhere and accredited also to the country of residence and perhaps other countries.

Rejection of ambassadorial candidates
It has been reported on several occasions that the Holy See will reject ambassadorial candidates whose personal lives are not in accordance with Catholic teachings. In 1973, the Vatican rejected the nomination of Dudley McCarthy as Australia's non-resident ambassador due to his status as a divorcee. According to press accounts in Argentina in January 2008, the country's nominee as ambassador, Alberto Iribarne, a Catholic, was rejected on the grounds that he was living with a woman other than the wife from whom he was divorced. In September 2008, French and Italian press reports likewise claimed that the Holy See had refused the approval of several French ambassadorial candidates, including a divorcee and an openly gay man.

Massimo Franco, author of Parallel Empires, asserted in April 2009 that the Obama administration had put forward three candidates for consideration for the position of United States Ambassador to the Holy See, but each of them had been deemed insufficiently anti-abortion by the Vatican. This claim was denied by the Holy See's spokesman Federico Lombardi, and was dismissed by former ambassador Thomas Patrick Melady as being in conflict with diplomatic practice. Vatican sources said that it is not the practice to vet the personal ideas of those who are proposed as ambassadors to the Holy See, though in the case of candidates who are Catholics and who are living with someone, their marital status is taken into account. Divorced people who are not Catholics can in fact be accepted, provided their marriage situation is in accord with the rules of their own religion.

Treaties and concordats

Since the Holy See is legally capable of ratifying international treaties, and does ratify them, it has negotiated numerous bilateral treaties with states and it has been invited to participate – on equal footing with States – in the negotiation of most universal International law-making treaties. Traditionally, an agreement on religious matters between the Holy See of the Catholic Church and a sovereign state is called a concordat. This often includes both recognition and privileges for the Catholic Church in a particular country, such as exemptions from certain legal matters and processes, issues such as taxation, as well as the right of a state to influence the selection of bishops within its territory.

Bibliography
 Breger, Marshall J. et al. eds. The Vatican and Permanent Neutrality (2022) excerpt

 Cardinale, Hyginus Eugene (1976). The Holy See and the International Order. Colin Smythe, (Gerrards Cross). .

See also
 Apostolic Nunciature
 Holy See and the United Nations
 Index of Vatican City-related articles
 Legal status of the Holy See

References

External links
 Bilateral relations of the Holy See (official vatican site)
 Lecture on Vatican diplomacy, by Archbishop Jean-Louis Tauran
 Diplomatic Relations Of The Holy See